Chiswick Park may refer to:

Chiswick Business Park
Chiswick House§Gardens
Chiswick Park Footbridge
Chiswick Park tube station